The Darkness is an English hard rock band formed in Lowestoft, Suffolk in 2000. Their first release was the extended play I Believe in a Thing Called Love in August 2002, which featured the tracks "I Believe in a Thing Called Love", "Love on the Rocks with No Ice" and "Love Is Only a Feeling", all of which were later featured on the band's debut album. After signing with Atlantic Records, the band released their debut album Permission to Land in July, which featured a total of ten tracks. Singles released to support the album were "Get Your Hands Off My Woman", "Growing on Me", "I Believe in a Thing Called Love" and "Love Is Only a Feeling", all of which featured new B-sides. The B-sides "The Best of Me" (from "Get Your Hands Off My Woman") and "Makin' Out" (from "I Believe in a Thing Called Love") were also featured on the Japanese edition of Permission to Land. "Christmas Time (Don't Let the Bells End)" was released at the end of the year, and also featured on the Christmas reissue of the album.

The band's second album, One Way Ticket to Hell... and Back, was released in November 2005, and also featured ten tracks. The album was supported by the release of singles "One Way Ticket", "Is It Just Me?" and "Girlfriend"; the first two featured new B-sides, while the third featured remixes of the A-side. The B-side "Grief Hammer", originally from the single "One Way Ticket", was also featured on the Japanese edition of One Way Ticket to Hell... and Back. The band broke up in 2006, and in 2008 the compilation album The Platinum Collection and box set Permission to Land/One Way Ticket to Hell... were released, each featuring all 20 songs from the band's first two albums ("Christmas Time (Don't Let the Bells End)" was also included on The Platinum Collection).

The Darkness reunited in 2011, and in August 2012 they released their third album, Hot Cakes. The album features eleven tracks, including the band's first studio cover version, of Radiohead's "Street Spirit (Fade Out)". The deluxe edition of Hot Cakes features four additional tracks, three of which are new songs; the bonus track "Cannonball" features Ian Anderson of the band Jethro Tull on flute. In 2014 Graham left the band again, to be replaced by Emily Dolan Davies, who performed on the band's fourth album Last of Our Kind. Davies later left herself, and was replaced by Rufus Tiger Taylor.

Songs

Notes
A.  Featured on special deluxe editions of Last of Our Kind only.
B.  Also featured on the 2008 compilation album The Platinum Collection.
C.  Featured on special deluxe editions of Hot Cakes only.
D.  Featured on the Christmas reissue of Permission to Land only.
E.  Also featured on special deluxe editions of One Way Ticket to Hell... and Back.
F.  Originally featured on the 2002 extended play I Believe in a Thing Called Love.
G.  Also featured on special deluxe editions of Permission to Land.

References

External links
List of The Darkness songs at AllMusic

Darkness, The